Dzierzby Szlacheckie  is a village in the administrative district of Gmina Jabłonna Lacka, within Sokołów County, Masovian Voivodeship, in east-central Poland.

The village has a population of 240.

References

Dzierzby Szlacheckie